Knautia macedonica, the Macedonian scabious, is a species of flowering plant in the family Caprifoliaceae, native to Southeastern Europe - Albania, Bulgaria, Greece, North Macedonia, southeastern Romania  and Kırklareli in Turkey.

Knautia macedonica is cultivated as an ornamental plant. Though it may be short-lived, it self-seeds readily.

References

Flora of Albania
Flora of Bulgaria
Flora of Greece
Flora of North Macedonia
Flora of Romania
Flora of Turkey
macedonica